Robby Novak (born October 24, 2003) is an American actor and media personality best known for portraying Kid President on YouTube and on television.

Early life 
Robby Novak was born on October 24, 2003. He and his sister, Lexi, were adopted by David and Lori Novak. Novak is from Henderson, Tennessee.

Career 
Novak released his first YouTube video in July 2012, on the channel SoulPancake. His breakout video, which has 48 million views as of December 2022, is titled "A Pep Talk from Kid President to You." Montague describes it as "

Novak is featured in a series of YouTube videos and in a television show, produced by actor Rainn Wilson. Novak's first YouTube clip as Kid President, written and directed by his brother-in-law Brad Montague, was uploaded in the summer of 2012 and subsequently published on Wilson's YouTube channel in October 2012. Novak was featured in a television show on Hub Network called Kid President: Declaration of Awesome in the summer of 2014. In October 2019, the first episode of a new YouTube series titled Are We There Yet? was uploaded on Wilson's YouTube channel. The series will show Novak and Montague's trip around the United States in which they meet children who are trying to "make the world a little more awesome".

Personal life
Novak suffers from osteogenesis imperfecta, a condition where his bones break easily. As a result, Novak has had over 70 broken bones and several major surgeries.

References

American male child actors
Living people
People with osteogenesis imperfecta
People from Henderson, Tennessee
2004 births